Rivera may refer to:

People
 Rivera (surname), people with the surname
 Rivera (given name):
 José Rivera Indarte (1814–1845), Argentine poet and journalist

Places
 Rivera, Buenos Aires, a town in Buenos Aires Province, Argentina
 Rivera, Huila, Colombia
 Rivera, Switzerland
 Rivera-Bironico railway station
 Rivera Department, Uruguay
 Rivera, capital of that department
 Pico Rivera, California

See also
 Ribera (disambiguation)
 Riviera (disambiguation)
 Riva (disambiguation)